Tower of Saviors (神魔之塔) is a mobile game developed by Mad Head Limited, a Hong Kong-based mobile application developer. Tower of Saviors is a combination of a match 3 game and an RPG, with characters from various mythologies and cultures.

Lore
Tower of Saviors takes place in a fantasy world where players assume the role of "Summoners" and collect various monster cards with various mythological backgrounds and rarities as the player moved on.

According to the game's story, in ancient times, Humankind built a tower and named it the Enochian Tower. It was used to reach the heavens and learn the ways of the Gods. Once It was built, Demons in both Hell and Earth tried to use it as a gateway to enter and destroy the world of the Gods. A bloody war started between the Gods, the Demons and mankind within the walls of the Enochian Tower. Just when the Demons were about to succeed in their plan, The Gods used the last of their strength to break off the tip of the tower and placed seals on the tower and sealed the Demons within. Thousands of years later, The humans were still caught in the seemingly endless war with the remaining Demons in the tower. The only hope lies on Summoners to unleash the Seals within the Enochian Tower and seek help from the Gods.

Gameplay

Players progress through the story by defeating monsters through stages through aligning runestones. Runestones are tiles that players have to align horizontally or vertically with a minimum of 3 Runestones in order to dissolve them. Aligning at least 3 Runestones of the same attribute will give the players' monsters power to attack, corresponding with the attributes of the Runestones, which are Water, Fire, Earth, Light and Dark. Runestones can be moved all over the board within a certain time limit every round. Once the time is up, the attack power will be calculated according to the number of Runestones dissolved. Players can make a Combo by dissolving 2 or more combinations of Runestones. The more combos the player makes, the more powerful the attack launched on enemies.

Each card is given an attribute and contains three statistics: health, attack and recovery, as well as its own Active skill and Leader skill which increases the dynamics of the game. Players form teams of Monsters of up to five cards with one leader, whose leader skill will apply to the rest of the team. The team's health, attack, recovery depends on the individual statistics of the cards as well as the leader skill applied. Players can form and store an increasingly large number of teams corresponding to their level in-game. Before gameplay, users can choose an ally from the friends in-game as well as 3 random player's avatars. The leader skill of the ally will also apply to the team. During gameplay, players face monsters with a specific health, attack and defence. The number of moves the player makes before the monster attacks is represented by the letters "CD", standing for cooldown, above the monster. The active skill of a player's cards also needs a certain number of rounds before being ready to activate.

Every player has an energy limit that increases in capacity as they level up; it is displayed at the bottom of the home screen. One unit of energy is restored automatically every 8 minutes until the bar is full. Energy is used in order to participate in battles. At the end of each battle, a certain amount of experience is gained; this is shown in the top-left of the home screen along with the level of the player. Users accumulate experience in order to level up, which restores the energy of the player.

Users progress through the main storyline of the game by completing stages found in the five locations found on the home screen in, clockwise from top-left: Glacial Iceberg, Afire Volcano, Dark Cove, Divine Woodland, and Holylight City, each representing a specific attribute before reaching Enochian Tower (Centre) and unlocking various "seals". After the seventh seal is defeated, users progress to the eighth and ninth seals beyond the reaches of the tower, which can be accessed by scrolling upwards from the home page. Main stages are always available once they are unlocked.

Additional levels can be accessed through a floating boat and a flying dragon to the left and right of the tower, respectively. Players could take part in daily stages and special stages lasting for a limited time through the boat. Daily stages provide players with evolution materials for evolving cards. Players access "Story Stages" from the flying dragon which include extra stages of four different difficulties with themes based on different cultures such as Zodiacs and Norse mythology.

There are two types of main currencies in the game: Coins and Diamonds. Coins can be collected from battles and through discomposing cards, while diamonds are obtained from completing a set of stages in-game. Coins are used for levelling up and evolving cards as well as trading cards and unlocking old stages. Diamonds are used for reviving a battle if the player was killed, refilling energy, increasing storage space and drawing rare cards from the "diamond seal" (five diamonds each draw).

Cards are stored in the inventory, where they can be levelled up, evolved or decomposed. Cards could be fed to other cards to increase their level, which increases their statistics. Unwanted cards could be decomposed for souls and coins. Once a card has reached its maximum level, it could be evolved into a card with higher statistics, and sometimes more powerful active and leader skills. Evolution of a card requires the possession of specific cards. Other stages of evolution, "Power Release" and "Virtual Rebirth", do not require the previous card to be levelled up completely. Instead, players will have to undergo a specific stage, in which passing it will complete the evolution. Various cards could also be upgraded through "Amelioration", in which their statistics and skills could be increased.

Another way a card could be upgraded is by reducing their cooldown time. This is done by accumulating the number of rounds a card has battled. The number of rounds required to reduce cooldown time increases as cooldown time decreases. Another possibility is by feeding a card with another card with the same active skill, although the effect is not guaranteed unless five cards of the same active skill are fed to the same card.

Players can join Guilds, which allow them to collect keys that allow them access to levels that contain rare cards. Players collect keys by completing "Guild Missions", which involve completing various missions or donating coins.

Plagiarism claim 
Mad Head has been accused of plagiarism due to alleged gameplay similarities between Tower of Saviors and Puzzle & Dragons, a popular Japanese mobile game. However, Terry Tsang Kin-chung, CEO of Mad Head, has repeatedly denied the allegations through the media.

References

Links 

2013 video games
Tile-matching video games
Android (operating system) games
IOS games
Video games developed in Hong Kong